The 1997-98 Melbourne Monarchs season was the 7th season for the team. As was the case for the Monarchs's previous seasons they competed in the Australian Baseball League (ABL).

Offseason

Regular season

Standings

Record vs opponents

Game log 

|- bgcolor=#bbffbb
| 1
| 31 October
| @ 
| 8–6
| 
| 
| 
| 
| 1-0
| 
|-

|- bgcolor=#bbffbb
| 2
| 1 November (DH 1)
| 
| 10–6
| 
| 
| 
| 
| 2-0
| 
|- bgcolor=#bbffbb
| 3
| 1 November (DH 2)
| 
| 7–2
| 
| 
| 
| 
| 3-0
| 
|- bgcolor=#ffbbbb
| 4
| 2 November
| @ 
| 2–8
| 
| 
| 
| 
| 3-1
| 
|- bgcolor=#bbffbb
| 5
| 7 November
| @ 
| 3–1
| 
| 
| 
| 
| 4-1
| 
|- bgcolor=#ffbbbb
| 6
| 8 November (DH 1)
| @ 
| 0–3
| 
| 
| 
| 
| 4-2
| 
|- bgcolor=#ffbbbb
| 7
| 8 November (DH 2)
| @ 
| 4–9
| 
| 
| 
| 
| 4-3
| 
|- bgcolor=#ffbbbb
| 8
| 9 November
| @ 
| 4–7
| 
| 
| 
| 
| 4-4
| 
|- bgcolor=#ffbbbb
| 9
| 14 November
| 
| ?–?
| 
| 
| 
| 
| 4-5
| 
|- bgcolor=#ffbbbb
| 10
| 15 November (DH 1)
| 
| 2–7
| 
| 
| 
| 
| 4-6
| 
|- bgcolor=#bbffbb
| 11
| 15 November (DH 2)
| 
| ?–?
| 
| 
| 
| 
| 5-6
| 
|- bgcolor=#ffbbbb
| 12
| 16 November
| 
| ?–?
| 
| 
| 
| 
| 5-7
| 
|- bgcolor=#bbffbb
| 13
| 21 November
| 
| 7–6
| 
| 
| 
| 
| 6-7
| 
|- bgcolor=#ffbbbb
| 14
| 22 November (DH 1)
| 
| 1–6
| 
| 
| 
| 
| 6-8
| 
|- bgcolor=#ffbbbb
| 15
| 22 November (DH 2)
| 
| 5–9
| 
| 
| 
| 
| 6-9
| 
|- bgcolor=#bbffbb
| 16
| 23 November
| 
| 2–0
| 
| 
| 
| 
| 7-9
| 
|-

|- bgcolor=#ffbbbb
| 17
| 5 December
| @ 
| 2–3
| 
| 
| 
| 
| 7-10
| 
|- bgcolor=#ffbbbb
| 18
| 6 December (DH 1)
| @ 
| 5–6
| 
| 
| 
| 
| 7-11
| 
|- bgcolor=#bbffbb
| 19
| 6 December (DH 2)
| @ 
| 8–4
| 
| 
| 
| 
| 8-11
| 
|- bgcolor=#ffbbbb
| 20
| 7 December
| @ 
| 5–18
| 
| 
| 
| 
| 8-12
| 
|- bgcolor=#ffbbbb
| 21
| 14 December (DH 1)
| @ 
| 9–10
| 
| 
| 
| 
| 8-13
| 
|- bgcolor=#bbffbb
| 22
| 14 December (DH 2)
| @ 
| 7–2
| P. Dale
| 
| 
| 
| 9-13
| 
|- bgcolor=#bbffbb
| 23
| 15 December (DH 1)
| @ 
| 3–0
| E. Nelsen
| 
| R. Spear
| 
| 10-13
| 
|- bgcolor=#bbffbb
| 24
| 15 December (DH 2)
| @ 
| 6–4
| 
| 
| 
| 
| 11-13
| 
|- bgcolor=#ffbbbb
| 25
| 19 December
| 
| 3–5
| 
| 
| 
| 
| 11-14
| 
|- bgcolor=#bbffbb
| 26
| 20 December (DH 1)
| 
| 6–3
| 
| 
| 
| 
| 12-14
| 
|- bgcolor=#bbffbb
| 27
| 20 December (DH 2)
| 
| 1–0
| 
| 
| 
| 
| 13-14
| 
|- bgcolor=#ffbbbb
| 28
| 21 December
| 
| 5–6
| 
| 
| 
| 
| 13-15
| 
|- bgcolor=#bbffbb
| 29
| 26 December
| 
| 4–1
| P. Dale
| B. Cederbladd
| 
| 
| 14-15
| 
|- bgcolor=#bbffbb
| 30
| 27 December (DH 1)
| 
| 2–1
| E. Nelson
| 
| 
| 
| 15-15
| 
|- bgcolor=#bbffbb
| 31
| 27 December (DH 2)
| 
| 4–0
| M. Bowie
| 
| 
| 
| 16-15
| 
|- bgcolor=#bbffbb
| 32
| 28 December
| 
| 6–0
| E. Byrne
| 
| 
| 
| 17-15
| 
|-

|- bgcolor=#bbffbb
| 33
| 3 January
| @ 
| 8–3
| 
| 
| 
| 
| 18-15
| 
|- bgcolor=#bbffbb
| 34
| 4 January
| @ 
| 7–5
| 
| 
| 
| 
| 19-15
| 
|- bgcolor=#bbffbb
| 35
| 5 January
| @ 
| 3–2
| 
| 
| 
| 
| 20-15
| 
|- bgcolor=#bbffbb
| 36
| 8 January
| @ 
| 6–2
| 
| 
| 
| 
| 21-15
| 
|- bgcolor=#ffbbbb
| 37
| 9 January
| @ 
| 3–7
| 
| 
| 
| 
| 21-16
| 
|- bgcolor=#bbffbb
| 38
| 10 January
| @ 
| 14-4
| E. Nelson
| 
| 
| 
| 22-16
| 
|- bgcolor=#ffbbbb
| 39
| 16 January (DH 1)
| 
| 1–2
| Williams
| R Spear
| 
| 
| 22-17
| 
|- bgcolor=#bbffbb
| 40
| 16 January (DH 2)
| 
| 4–3
| E. Nelson
| Smith
| 
| 
| 23-17
| 
|- bgcolor=#bbffbb
| 41
| 17 January (DH 1)
| 
| 11–10
| K. Gogos
| Gooda
| 
| 
| 24-17
| 
|- bgcolor=#bbffbb
| 42
| 17 January (DH 2)
| 
| 12–11
| K. Gogos
| Foxover
| 
| 
| 25-17
| 
|- bgcolor=#bbffbb
| 43
| 22 January
| @ 
| 10–9
| 
| 
| 
| 
| 26-17
| 
|- bgcolor=#bbffbb
| 44
| 23 January
| @ 
| 5–1
| 
| 
| 
| 
| 27-17
| 
|- bgcolor=#ffbbbb
| 45
| 24 January
| @ 
| 3–4
| 
| 
| 
| 
| 27-18
| 
|- bgcolor=#bbffbb
| 46
| 26 January
| @ 
| –
| 
| 
| 
| 
| 28-18
| 
|- bgcolor=#ffbbbb
| 47
| 27 January
| @ 
| 10–15
| 
| 
| 
| 
| 28-19
| 
|- bgcolor=#bbbbbb
| 48
| 28 January
| @ 
| Wash Out
| 
| 
| 
| 
| 28-19
| 
|- bgcolor=#bbffbb
| 49
| 30 January
| 
| 9–0
| 
| 
| 
| 
| 29-19
| 
|- bgcolor=#bbffbb
| 50
| 31 January (DH 1)
| 
| 9–5
| 
| 
| 
| 
| 30-19
| 
|- bgcolor=#bbffbb
| 51
| 31 January (DH 2)
| 
| 7–6
| 
| 
| 
| 
| 31-19
| 
|-

|- bgcolor=#bbffbb
| 52
| 5 February
| 
| 5-4
| 
| 
| 
| 
| 32-19
| 
|- bgcolor=#ffbbbb
| 53
| 6 February
| 
| 4-5
| 
| 
| 
| 
| 32-20
| 
|- bgcolor=#bbbbbb
| 54
| 7 February
| @ 
| Wash Out
| 
| 
| 
| 
| 32-20
| 
|-

Postseason

Finals Series at Melbourne Ballpark
In previous years the post season was played as home and away best of 3 games, with the two winner of each series meeting for a best of 5 series{fact}, in 1997-98 this was changed to a round robin play-off format with each team playing 3 games, 1 against each of the other 3 qualified teams, with the two highest places teams playing off in the Championship Series.

All games for the 9th ABL title were played at the Melbourne Ballpark from February, 10-12 with the best of three championship series February 14–15.

Finals Series (Monarchs games)
Full series results

Game 1: 10 February 1998

Game 3: 11 February 1998

Game 6: 12 February 1998

Postseason Ladder

Award Winners

ABL awards

All-stars

Monarchs Awards

Roster

References 

Melbourne Monarchs